Mount Erek (Varaga leř) is a mountain overlooking the city of Van in eastern Turkey.

The ruined prominent Armenian monastery of Varagavank ("monastery of Varag") is located at the foot of the mountain

References

Erek
Landforms of Van Province
Mountains of the Armenian Highlands
Three-thousanders of Turkey
Erek